Robert de Stafford ( 1039 – c. 1100) (alias Robert de Tosny/Toeni, etc.)  was an Anglo-Norman nobleman, the first feudal baron of Stafford in Staffordshire in England, where he built as his seat Stafford Castle. His many landholdings are listed in the Domesday Book of 1086.

Origins
According to Cawley, primary evidence is lacking to determine his parentage, but he is generally said to have been a son of Roger I of Tosny. Sanders (1960) gives him as a younger brother of Ralph I de Tosny (d. 1102), feudal baron of Flamstead in Hertfordshire who was the brother-in-law of William FitzOsbern, 1st Earl of Hereford. The de Tosny family originated at the manor of Tosny, Eure, arr. Louviers, cant. Gaillon.

Cawley states that Robert de Stafford's connection with the Tosny family is evidenced by an undated charter (quoted in Dugdale's Monasticon) in which "Robertus de Stafford" confirmed the donations to Wotton Wawen Abbey, Warwickshire made by "avus meus (my grandfather) Robertus de Toenio et pater meus (my father) Nicolaus de Stafford". Also "Robertus de Staffordia et Robertus filius meus et haeres (my son and heir)" confirmed donations of property to Evesham Monastery made by "Rodbertus avus meus ... et pater meus Nicholaus" again by undated charter.

Career
He founded Stone Priory in Staffordshire, which became the burial place of many of his family.

Possible wives and children

Adelisa de Savona
A few sources  say Robert de Stafford married Adelisa de Savona, by whom he had a daughter Adelisa de Toeni, who married Roger Bigod, 1st Earl of Norfolk. Yet the Adelisa de Tosny who married Roger Bigod of Norfolk (father of Hugh Bigod, 1st Earl of Norfolk), is known to have been the heiress of Belvoir Castle in Rutland, and thus clearly the daughter of Robert de Tosny, Lord of Belvoir, by his wife Adeliza fitzOsulf du Plessis, through whom Belvoir had been inherited, since the Feudal barony of Belvoir then passed to Cecily Bigod, the daughter of Roger Bigod by his wife Adelisa.

Avice de Clare
Robert de Stafford apparently married Avice de Clare, daughter of Richard fitz Gilbert (de Clare) son of Gilbert, Count of Brionne, by whom he had sons, variously listed as:
Nicholas I de Stafford (d.circa 1138), eldest son and heir, 2nd feudal baron of Stafford. For descent from him see feudal barony of Stafford.
Alan de Stafford
Roger de Stafford
Jordan de Stafford
Nigel de Stafford
Robert de Stafford

Landholdings
He held 131 manors as listed in the Domesday Book of 1086, a high proportion lying in Staffordshire. They included Barlaston and Bradley in Staffordshire and part of Duns Tew in Oxfordshire.

Death and burial
Robert de Stafford was buried in Evesham Abbey.

End of the Stafford family
The peak of the Stafford family was reached by Edward Stafford, 3rd Duke of Buckingham (1477–1521), who was executed for treason in 1521, on whose death "the princely House of Stafford fell to rise no more". Cleveland relates the descent of his children into obscurity and poverty as follows:
His only son, stripped alike of lands and dignities, received back a small fraction of its splendid possessions, with a seat and voice in parliament as a baron, and this title was borne by several generations. Edward, fourth Lord Stafford, "basely married to his mother's chambermaid," was succeeded by his grandson Henry, with whom the direct line terminated in 1637; and the claim of the last remaining heir, Roger, was rejected by the House of Lords on account of his poverty. This unfortunate man, the great-grandson of the last Duke, was then sixty-five, and had sunk into so abject a condition that he felt ashamed of bearing his own name, and long passed as Fludd, or Floyde, having, it is supposed, assumed the patronymic of one of his uncle's servants, who had reared and sheltered him in early life. He was compelled to surrender his barony to Charles I, and died unmarried in 1640; leaving an only sister, Jane, who in spite of her Plantagenet blood married a joiner, and had a son gaining a poor livelihood as a cobbler in 1637 at Newport in Shropshire".

Surviving direct descendants
The Gresley family of Drakelow, baronets, were descendants of the de Tosny family through their de Stafford ancestors, including Robert.

As Cleveland (d.1901) relates in her Battle Roll:One remaining branch of the royal Toenis still flourishes in the male line. Nigel de Toeni or De Stafford, a younger brother of the standard bearer's, held Drakelow, Gresley, and some other manors in Derbyshire and Staffordshire at the date of Domesday ; the former " by the service of rendering a bow without a string ; a quiver of Tutesbit (?) twelve fleched and one unfeathered arrow," sometimes called a buzon. Castle-Gresley took its name from his castle; and Church-Gresley marks the site of an Augustinian priory founded by his son William in the time of Henry I. Roger, the next heir, first bore the name of Gresley, that has been carried down to our own time by a long and honourable line of descent. His successors continued at Drakelow, and since the time of the first Edward have at various periods served as knights of the shire and High Sheriffs of their native county. Sir Geoffrey, in 1330, claimed the right of having a gallows at Drakelow and Gresley; Sir Nicholas, during the same reign, married a great heiress, Thomasin de Wasteneys ; Sir William served Henry VIII. in his French wars, and dying issueless, was succeeded by his brother George, who was installed a Knight of the Bath at the coronation of Anne Boleyn. Two others. Sir William and Sir Thomas, one Sheriff of Stafford, the other of Derby, were knighted by Queen Elizabeth ; and the next in succession, George, received a baronetcy in 1611. " He was an active officer in the Parliamentary service during the Civil War, and was Lieut. -Colonel to Sir William Gell." — Lysons. In the beginning of the present century Sir Roger Gresley alienated much of the property ; and, having no children, parcelled out the remainder in such a manner that, by annual sales, it should last him his life ; but he died a comparatively young man, and Drakelow, " the only estate remaining in the county that has continued in the same family from the time of Domesday," is now held by his representative, Sir Robert Gresley''.

Notes

External links
JohnStafford.org: Searching For the First Stafford and his wife the Elusive Avice de Clare
Stafford Family Genealogy Web Site: Robert de Toni (archived at Internet Archive)

1030s births
1088 deaths
11th-century English nobility
Anglo-Normans
Robert
People from Stafford
Burials at Evesham Abbey